Kim Yong-sun (1934 – 26 October 2003) was a North Korean politician. At the time of his death, he was vice-chairman of the Committee for the Peaceful Reunification of the Fatherland. He was reported to have been killed in a car accident. He also held a position as a secretary (subordinate to the general secretary) of the Workers' Party of Korea (WPK).

Career
Kim was born in 1934 in South Pyongan, when the Korean Peninsula was still under Japanese rule. He was elevated to the WPK's Central Committee in October 1980. He was a recipient of the Kim Il-sung Order, the highest decoration of the North Korean government. 

According to author Bradley K. Martin, Kim was interned in a 're-education camp' for three years from 1979 because he had an affair with a female colleague. According to author Don Oberdorfer, he was flamboyant and was demoted in the mid-1980s for decadent behavior. However, his career was saved because of his friendship with Kim Jong-il and his sister Kim Kyong-hui. In 1992, he visited New York City to prepare for North Korea's accession to the United Nations and held the highest-level US-DPRK diplomatic meetings to that time with Arnold Kanter, Richard Solomon, Douglas Paal, and James Lilley of the U.S. State Department. 

Kim played an instrumental role in the planning of the first Inter-Korean summit between Kim Dae-jung and Kim Jong-il in June 2000. He came to the South in September that year as part of an official Northern delegation, and inspected POSCO facilities in Pohang; he was the first secretary of the WPK to take an inspection tour in the South since Ho Dam in 1985. After reportedly being involved in a car accident in June 2003, he was hospitalised, and succumbed to his injuries on 23 October 2003.

References

1934 births
2003 deaths
Road incident deaths in North Korea
Workers' Party of Korea politicians
Recipients of the Order of Kim Il-sung
People from South Pyongan